The Santa Barbara International Film Festival (SBIFF) is an eleven-day film festival held in Santa Barbara, California since 1986.

The festival boasts screenings of over 200 feature films and shorts from different countries and regions. SBIFF also includes celebrity tributes, industry panels and education programs.

History 
Over the years, SBIFF has invited numerous potential award-winning celebrities, including Cate Blanchett, Guillermo Del Toro, Laura Dern, Leonardo DiCaprio,  Angelina Jolie, Jennifer Lawrence, Heath Ledger, Eddie Redmayne, Martin Scorsese,  and Kate Winslet. 

In 2006, a third of the festival's slots were dedicated to films by Hispanic filmmakers. Programming categories at that time included Nature films, "surf flicks" and adventure-sports films.

In addition to its annual festival in February, the SBIFF "Cinema Society" hosts programming year round at the Riviera Theater in Santa Barbara.

Awards 

 Maltin Modern Master Award
 Montecito Award
 Outstanding Performer(s) of the Year Award
 The American Riviera™ Award
 Cinema Vanguard Award
 Virtuosos Award
 The Panavision Spirit Award for Independent Cinema
 The Best International Film Award
 The Nueva Vision Award for the best Spanish/Latin American film
 Best Documentary Film Award
 Bruce Corwin Award for Best Live Action Short Film
 Bruce Corwin Award for Best Animation Short Film
 The Fund for Santa Barbara Social Justice Award
 The Audience Choice Award
 10-10-10 Student Filmmaking Competition
 10-10-10 Student Screenwriting Competition

Montecito Award 

 2005 : Annette Bening
 2006 : Naomi Watts
 2007 : Bill Condon
 2008 : Javier Bardem
 2009 : Kate Winslet
 2010 : Julianne Moore
 2011 : Geoffrey Rush
 2013 : Daniel Day-Lewis
 2014 : Oprah Winfrey
 2015 : Jennifer Aniston
 2016 : Sylvester Stallone
 2017 : Isabelle Huppert
 2018 : Saoirse Ronan
 2019 : Melissa McCarthy
 2020 : Lupita Nyong'o
 2021 : Amanda Seyfried
 2022 : Penelope Cruz
 2023 : Angela Bassett

Outstanding Performer(s) of the Year Award 

 2004 : Charlize Theron for The Italian Job and Monster
 2005 : Kate Winslet for Eternal Sunshine of the Spotless Mind and Finding Neverland
 2006 : Heath Ledger for Brokeback Mountain
 2007 : Helen Mirren for The Queen
 2008 : Angelina Jolie for A Mighty Heart
 2009 : Penélope Cruz for Elegy and Vicky Cristina Barcelona
 2010 : Colin Firth for A Single Man
 2011 : James Franco for 127 Hours
 2012 : Viola Davis for The Help
 2013 : Jennifer Lawrence for Silver Linings Playbook and The Hunger Games
 2014 : Cate Blanchett for Blue Jasmine
 2015 : Steve Carell for Foxcatcher
 2016 : Brie Larson for Room & Saoirse Ronan for Brooklyn
 2017 : Ryan Gosling & Emma Stone for La La Land
 2018 : Allison Janney & Margot Robbie for I, Tonya
 2019 : Rami Malek for Bohemian Rhapsody
 2020 : Adam Driver & Scarlett Johansson for Marriage Story
 2021 : Sacha Baron Cohen for Borat Subsequent Moviefilm and The Trial of the Chicago 7
 2022 : Will Smith & Aunjanue Ellis for'' King Richard
 2023 : Cate Blanchett for TÁR

American Riviera Award 
 2004 : Diane Lane
 2005 : Kevin Bacon
 2006 : Philip Seymour Hoffman
 2007 : Forest Whitaker
 2008 : Tommy Lee Jones
 2009 : Mickey Rourke
 2010 : Sandra Bullock
 2011 : Annette Bening
 2012 : Martin Scorsese
 2013 : Quentin Tarantino
 2014 : Robert Redford
 2015 : Patricia Arquette and Ethan Hawke
 2016 : Michael Keaton, Rachel McAdams and Mark Ruffalo
 2017 : Jeff Bridges
 2018 : Sam Rockwell
 2019 : Viggo Mortensen
 2020 : Renée Zellweger
 2021 : Delroy Lindo
 2022 : Kristen Stewart
 2023 : Brendan Fraser

10-10-10 Student Film Competition 
One feature of the film festival is the 10-10-10 competition. Students enrolled at Santa Barbara area high schools and colleges are invited to submit either a 10-page sample of writing for the Screenwriting portion of the competition, or a five-minute sample of their best filmmaking efforts for the directing portion. Ten writers are selected to write one 10-minute script each; the scripts are then matched with the ten filmmakers. Those students then have ten days to shoot and edit the completed ten-minute short film, during the ten days of the festival. Films are screened and winners are announced on closing night.  A selection committee consisting of representatives from each school, Industry professionals and SBIFF representatives select the participants.

The program was extended into a summer camp where area youths from schools and local Boys & Girls Clubs learned filmmaking skills.

References

External links 

Santa Barbara Film Commission
Santa Barbara International Film Festival - A Photoessay by Scott London

Film festivals in California
Cinema of Southern California
Culture of Santa Barbara, California
Organizations based in Santa Barbara County, California
Tourist attractions in Santa Barbara, California
Organizations established in 1986